Jason Jung was the defending champion but lost in the second round to Maximilian Marterer.

Zsombor Piros won the title after defeating Emilio Gómez 6–2, 6–4 in the final.

Seeds

Draw

Finals

Top half

Bottom half

References

External links
Main draw
Qualifying draw

Gwangju Open - 1
2022 Singles